The Tomb of Abdolabad is a historical tomb and chahartaqi of Ilkhanate era in Abdolabad village at Bardaskan County.The tomb was added to the list of National Monuments of Iran as the 10,908th monument.

Gallery

See also 
 Aliabad Tower
 Cultural Heritage, Handcrafts and Tourism Organization
 Firuzabad Tower
 Seyyed Bagher Ab anbar

Notes and references 

Buildings and structures in Bardaskan
Tombs in Iran
National works of Iran
Tourist attractions in Razavi Khorasan Province
Chahartaqis